Antoine Melchior Gaspard de Bernier de Pierrevert (Château de Pierrevert Sisteron, 6 January 1754 — Bellone, off Batacalo, 3 September 1782) was a French Navy officer. He was nephew to Suffren and brother to Louis Jérôme Charles François de Bernier de Pierrevert.

Biography 
Pierrevert was born to Euphrosine Madeleine de Suffren de Saint-Tropez and Paul Auguste de Bernier de Pierrevert.

In July 1782, in the wake of the Battle of Negapatam, Suffren reshuffled several of his captains. Beaulieu, captain of Bellone, was promoted to the 64-gun Brillant. To replace him, he appointed Pierrevert. 

On 12 August 1782, in the runup to the Battle of Trincomalee, Bellone had her mainmast damaged by a gust of wind and sailed to Batacalo for repairs. En route, she encountered , under Andrew Mitchell. The Action of 12 August 1782 ensued. In its opening, Pierrevert was struck by a bullet and killed.

Sources and references 
 Notes

References

 Bibliography
 

External links
 

French Navy officers
1754 births
1782 deaths
French military personnel killed in the American Revolutionary War